Stannocene is an organometallic compound with the formula .
It is a metallocene that can be produced efficiently from cyclopentadienyl sodium and tin(II) chloride. Unlike in ferrocene the two cyclopentadienyl rings are not parallel.

References

Organotin compounds
Metallocenes
Tin(II) compounds
Cyclopentadienyl complexes